Funny Farm is a 1988 American comedy film starring Chevy Chase and Madolyn Smith. The film was adapted from a 1985 comedic novel of the same name by Jay Cronley. The movie was filmed on location in Vermont, mostly in Townshend, Vermont. It was the final film directed by George Roy Hill.

Plot
Andy Farmer (Chase) is a New York City sports writer who moves with his wife, Elizabeth (Smith) to the seemingly charming town of Redbud, Vermont, so he can write a novel. They do not get along well with the residents, and other quirks arise such as being given exorbitant funeral bills for a long-dead man buried on their land years before they acquired the house. 

Marital troubles soon arise from the quirkiness of Redbud as well as the fact that Elizabeth was critical of Andy's manuscript, while writing her own manuscripts for children's books. Andy's publisher stops into town to personally see the manuscript of the novel after letters informing him of his deadline go unanswered. To avoid having to return the advance that the publisher gave him, Andy takes one of Elizabeth's manuscripts and passes it off as his own.  After Elizabeth receives a call from Andy's publisher praising the work on "his children's book", she leaves Andy out of anger.

They soon decide to divorce and sell their home. To expedite the sale, the Farmers offer the town's residents a $15,000 donation to Redbud, and $50 cash each if they help make a good impression on their prospective home buyers. To that end, the citizens remake Redbud into a perfect Norman Rockwell-style town. Their charade dazzles a pair of prospective buyers, who make the Farmers an offer on the house; however, Andy declines to sell, realizing that he genuinely enjoys small-town living. 

He and Elizabeth decide to stay together in Redbud, much to the chagrin of the locals, who are now angry that they lost their promised money. Though the mayor does not hold the Farmers liable for the $15,000, as the sale of their house did not occur, Andy decides to pay everyone in Redbud their $50, which helps improve his standing among the townspeople. The film ends with Andy taking a job as a sports writer for the Redbud newspaper, and Elizabeth, now pregnant with their first child, having written multiple children's stories.

Cast
Chevy Chase as Andy Farmer
Madolyn Smith as Elizabeth Farmer
Kevin O'Morrison as Sheriff Ledbetter
Alice Drummond as Ethel Dinges
Mike Starr as Crocker
Glenn Plummer as Mickey
Joseph Maher as Michael Sinclair
Bill Fagerbakke as Lon Criterion
Nicholas Wyman as Dirk Criterion
William Newman as Gus Lotterhand
Kevin Conway as Crum Petree
Brad Sullivan as Brock
William Duell as the old character
Jack Gilpin as Bud Culbertson
Caris Corfman as Betsy Culbertson

Production
Screenwriter Jeffrey Boam said he "loved" the book. "It was exactly the kind of movie I always wanted to write,” said Boam. “It needed a lot of work because it wasn’t told in the fashion that could be filmed, but I loved the idea of working with Chevy. He was a comedy hero of mine and still is.”

Boam says the tone of the film changed from what he expected when director George Roy Hill signed. "George wanted to do a much classier version than I ever imagined it to be," said Boam. "I imagined it to be a little cruder, more low-brow humor, rougher and more like the movies Chevy was doing at the time, but George was a classy guy and he wasn’t going to do that. He does what he does. He made the movie classy, and I think a lot of Chevy’s fans were let down because it wasn’t as raucous and vulgar as they might have expected."

Reception
Funny Farm received mixed reviews at the time of its release. On Rotten Tomatoes, the film has a 62% rating, based on 21 reviews, with an average rating of 5.1/10.

Vincent Canby, in his review for The New York Times, called the film "good-natured even when it's not funny," and went on to say that its best jokes are recycled from other, better, films. In a negative review for the Los Angeles Times, Michael Wilmington said "Funny Farm – a weak-fish-out-of-water comedy about a New York City couple who see their rural paradise turned into a rustic hell–is a movie with a doubly deceptive title. This movie isn't about a farm, and it isn't very funny, either." In a staff review, Variety said, "As pleasant yuppie comedies go, this is about par."

However, film critics Roger Ebert and Gene Siskel were strong champions of the film, praising it on The Oprah Winfrey Show, The Tonight Show Starring Johnny Carson, and At the Movies. Ebert called the film a "small miracle," while Siskel said it was "the best film Chase has made" and compared it to the films of Preston Sturges. Siskel and Ebert collectively praised the script's numerous laugh-out-loud moments, the strong direction, the beautiful cinematography, and editing which consistently ends scenes at just the right moment.

The film grossed $25 million on a $19 million budget, making it a modest box office success, but was seen as an overall disappointment especially considering Chevy Chase's popularity as a comic actor in the 1980s with a handful of box office hits. It was released during a very busy summer movie season. The Tom Hanks comedy Big, now considered a classic comedy, opened the same day and became one of the year's highest grossing films while Crocodile Dundee II was in its second week of release and also became one of the year's biggest hits. Other releases throughout the summer including Coming to America, Who Framed Roger Rabbit, and Die Hard all were very high-grossing films giving Funny Farm a slim chance of high box office results in comparison.

With the success of National Lampoon's Christmas Vacation the following year, Funny Farm eventually gained a cult following and is now regarded by critics and Chevy Chase fans as one of his best films.

Then-U.S. President Ronald Reagan viewed this film at Camp David on June 11, 1988.

See also
 List of Christmas films

References

External links

1988 films
1988 comedy films
American comedy films
Films scored by Elmer Bernstein
Films about writers
Films based on American novels
Films directed by George Roy Hill
Films set in New York City
Films set in Vermont
Films shot in Vermont
Films shot in New York City
Films with screenplays by Jeffrey Boam
Warner Bros. films
1980s English-language films
1980s American films
Films based on novels by Jay Cronley